Firestarter is a personal firewall tool that uses the Netfilter (iptables/ipchains) system built into the Linux kernel. It has the ability to control both inbound and outbound connections. Firestarter provides a graphical interface for configuring firewall rules and settings. It provides real-time monitoring of all network traffic for the system. Firestarter also provides facilities for port forwarding, internet connection sharing and DHCP service.

Firestarter is free and open-source software and uses GUI widgets from GTK+.  Note that it uses GTK2 and has not been upgraded to use GTK3 so the last Linux distributions it will run on are Ubuntu 18, Debian 9, etc.

See also 

Uncomplicated Firewall
iptables
netfilter

References

External links
 
 Firestarter manual on SourceForge
 How to Set Up a Firewall in Linux

Firewall software
Software that uses GTK
Linux security software
Discontinued software